Hur Seung-Wook (born 25 April 1972 in Suwon) is a South Korean alpine skier who competed at five consecutive Winter Olympics from 1988 to 2002.

He is the second Korean, after shooter Lee Eun-chul, to compete at five Olympics.

See also
 List of athletes with the most appearances at Olympic Games

External links
 

1972 births
Living people
South Korean male alpine skiers
Olympic alpine skiers of South Korea
Alpine skiers at the 1988 Winter Olympics
Alpine skiers at the 1992 Winter Olympics
Alpine skiers at the 1994 Winter Olympics
Alpine skiers at the 1998 Winter Olympics
Alpine skiers at the 2002 Winter Olympics
Asian Games medalists in alpine skiing
Asian Games gold medalists for South Korea
Asian Games silver medalists for South Korea
Asian Games bronze medalists for South Korea
Alpine skiers at the 1990 Asian Winter Games
Alpine skiers at the 1996 Asian Winter Games
Alpine skiers at the 1999 Asian Winter Games
Alpine skiers at the 2003 Asian Winter Games
Medalists at the 1990 Asian Winter Games
Medalists at the 1996 Asian Winter Games
Medalists at the 1999 Asian Winter Games
People from Suwon
Sportspeople from Gyeonggi Province
20th-century South Korean people
21st-century South Korean people